Musicians who are notable for their playing of ragtime music include (in alphabetical order):

William Albright (1944–1998)
John Arpin (1936–2007)
Winifred Atwell (1914–1983)
Mary Aufderheide (1888–1972)
Irving Berlin (1901–1989)
Mike Bernard (1881–1936)
Arthur "Blind" Blake (1896–1934)
Eubie Blake (1887–1983)
William Bolcom (1938–)
Euday L. Bowman (1887–1949)
Lou Busch (1910–1979)
Jo Ann Castle (1939–)
Louis Chauvin (1881–1908)
Zez Confrey (1895–1971)
Ford Dabney (1883–1958)
James Reese Europe (1880–1919)
William Ezell (1892–1963)
Blind Leroy Garnett (1897–1933)
Gene Greene (1881–1930)
Ben Harney (1872–1938)
Ernest Hogan (1865–1909)
Dick Hyman (1927–)
Tony Jackson (1876–1921)
Chas. Johnson (1876–1950)
James P. Johnson (1894–1955)
Scott Joplin (1867–1917)
Sue Keller (1952–)
Joseph Lamb (1887–1960)
George Lewis (1900–1968)
Johnny Maddox (1927–2018)
Arthur Marshall (1881–1968)
Artie Matthews (1888–1958)
The New Rags
Blind Willie McTell (1898–1959)
Bob Milne
John Mooney (1955–)
Julia Lee Niebergall (1886-1968)
Jelly Roll Morton (1890–1941)
Vess Ossman (1868–1923)
Harry Reser (1896–1965)
David Thomas Roberts (1955–)
Wally Rose (1913–1997)
Joshua Rifkin (1944–)
James Scott (1885–1938)
Muggsy Spanier (1901–1967)
Charley Straight (1891–1940)
Adam G. Swanson (20??–)
Wilbur Sweatman (1882–1961)
Charlie Tagawa (1935–2017)
Butch Thompson (1943–)
Tom Turpin (1871–1922)
Fred Van Eps (1913–1998)
Dave Van Ronk (1936–2002)
Terry Waldo (1944–)
Fats Waller (1904–1943)
Del Wood (1920–1989)
Dick Zimmerman (1937–)

See also 

Ragtime musicians
 əəəəəəə